KGFN (89.1 FM) is a radio station licensed to serve the community of Goldfield, Nevada. The station is owned by Radio Goldfield Broadcasting Inc., and airs a community radio format.

The station was assigned the KGFN call letters by the Federal Communications Commission on March 18, 2011.

Translator
KGFN rebroadcasts on the following translator, owned by Mineral Television District #1.

References

External links
 Official Website
 FCC Public Inspection File for KGFN
 

GFN
Radio stations established in 2011
2011 establishments in Nevada
Community radio stations in the United States
Esmeralda County, Nevada